The Matteo Pellicone Ranking Series 2021 was a wrestling event held in Ostia, Rome, Italy between 4 and 7 of March 2021. The first United World Wrestling Ranking Series event of the year, it featured multiple World and Olympic Champions, Pan-American Champions, European Champions, Asian Champions and NCAA Champions.

Medal overview

Medal table

Team ranking

Men's freestyle 
March 6–7

Men's Greco-Roman 
March 4–5

Women's freestyle 
March 4–5

References 

2021 in sport wrestling
2021 in Italian sport
International wrestling competitions hosted by Italy
Sport in Rome
Wrestling in Italy
March 2021 sports events in Italy